Jayant Maru is a Kenyan filmmaker based in Uganda. He has directed films like, The Route, K3NT & KAT3, and Sipi. He has worked with Olympian Stephen Kiprotich, Miss Uganda 2014 Leah Kalanguka, and actor Patriq Nkakalukanyi.

Filmography

References

External links
 English.cntv.cn
 Theinsider article
 Stagebrief.co.ug
 Vibetickets.co.uk
 Waafrikaonline.com
 Youtube footage
 Bigeye.ug
 Mwnation.com
 Kamukamapolly.wordpress.com
 Kamukamapolly.wordpress.com

1990 births
Living people
Ugandan film directors
Ugandan film producers
Ugandan screenwriters
Kenyan emigrants to Uganda